"Come On England" is a music single by the band 4-4-2. The song is a re-working of the Dexys Midnight Runners hit "Come On Eileen". A football-themed song, it was released on 7 June 2004 to coincide with the England national team's appearance at the European Championships. It entered the UK Singles Chart at number two, held off the number-one spot by "I Don't Wanna Know" by Mario Winans.

4-4-2 consisted of Phil Doleman (banjo), Mark Knight (fiddle), Jimmy McCafferty (drums), Lucy Wills (trumpet), Neil Murray (vocals), former Coventry City player Micky Quinn (vocals) and Ian Murphy (vocals). The band appeared on the U.K. TV shows CD:UK and, alongside Pharrell Williams and Blue, Top of the Pops to promote the single.

Music video
The video features the popular glamour models Lucy Pinder and Michelle Marsh.

Charts

Weekly charts

Year-end charts

See also
 "Three Lions"
 "World in Motion"

References

External links
 "Come On England" lyrics

2004 songs
2004 singles
England at UEFA Euro 2004
England national football team songs
Football songs and chants
UK Independent Singles Chart number-one singles